Cymothoe mabillei, the western red glider, is a butterfly in the family Nymphalidae. It is found in Guinea-Bissau, Guinea, Sierra Leone, Liberia, Ivory Coast and Ghana (west of the Volta River). The habitat consists of forests.

References

Butterflies described in 1944
Cymothoe (butterfly)